Sam Okoye (1 May 1980 – 31 August 2005) was a Nigerian football goalkeeper who represented Nigeria during the 1999 FIFA World Youth Championship.

Death
Four months after his 25th birthday, whilst living in Tehran, he reportedly died there after a few days illness. The cause and circumstances of his death have not been adequately elucidated and Iranian authorities did not release his remains for repatriation and burial in Nigeria until May 2006. The duo of Daniel Olerum and Sunny Okoye disclosed from the Iranian capital, Tehran that officials of Sorkh Poushan FC have agreed to foot the flight bills of the late footballer.

References

1980 births
2005 deaths
Sportspeople from Lagos
Nigerian footballers
Nigeria under-20 international footballers
Nigerian expatriate footballers
Rangers International F.C. players
Enyimba F.C. players
Expatriate footballers in Iran
Association football goalkeepers